is a Japanese voice actress and singer. She is capable of playing a variety of roles, ranging from young boys to feminine women. She is affiliated with Aoni Production. Her first major role was as Yurika Misumaru in Martian Successor Nadesico. She had lead or major roles as Sango in Inuyasha, Nakahito Kagura in Steel Angel Kurumi, Marlene Angel in Blue Gender, Kenny in Beyblade, Quon Kisaragi in RahXephon, Flay Allster in Mobile Suit Gundam Seed, Stella Loussier in Mobile Suit Gundam Seed Destiny, Sheila in Tweeny Witches, Itsuki Myoudouin / Cure Sunshine in Heartcatch PreCure!, Wendy Garret in Gun Sword, Shūrei Hong in The Story of Saiunkoku, Clare in Claymore, Michru Kita in Zombie-Loan, Fuyuki Hinata in Sgt. Frog, Cirucci and Soifon in Bleach, Shigure in Ninja Scroll: The Series, Allison in Allison and Lilia, and Uka in Inari, Konkon, Koi Iroha. In video games, she voiced Seshil Pound in Money Puzzle Exchanger, Mei Ling and Para-Medic in Metal Gear Solid, Seong Mi-na in Soulcalibur, Kasumi in Dead or Alive, Presea Combatir in the Tales series, Tomoyo Sakagami in Clannad, Isara Gunther in Valkyria Chronicles and Chizuru Yukimura in Hakuoki. On films, she had voice roles as the title character in Princess Arete, Yuki Mori in Space Battleship Yamato 2199, Rosé Thomas in Fullmetal Alchemist: Conqueror of Shamballa, and Poko in Doraemon: Nobita in the Robot Kingdom.

Biography 
Although a shy kid, she was interested in acting as an escapism from her real self, especially when she saw the musical and television dramas at the Shiki Theatre Company. Every time there were four seasons on local performances, it was almost like getting tickets for the parents and putting the heat that would go to see them in the family.

While in elementary school, Kuwashima watched Nausicaä of the Valley of the Wind while dreaming to become a voice actress. She wrote in a graduation collection, saying: "I want to make the child's voices in the anime project of Hayao Miyazaki." She learned that there is no drama club neither stage plays at the cultural festival at junior high school. At Iwate Prefectural Kurosawajiri North High School, she attended a correspondence course at Katsuta Voice Academy. The voice was blown to the cassette tape, and was corrected by voice actor Hisashi Katsuta who was a director. However, attendance at the time of advancement was insufficient, and from the third year it was transferred to Iwate Prefectural Forest Mausoleum High school.

After graduating, she moved to Tokyo. She entered Aoiso in 1994. In auditions after graduation, about 20 out of 71 people have passed the exam and belonged to Aoni Production. She made her debut in the 1995 anime series Sailor Moon S. In 1996, in the anime series Martian Successor Nadesico she gained the role of heroine Yurika Misumaru and gained popularity, and before that, she voiced Necrokaizer in the OVA series adaptation of 1995 Technōs/SNK's Neo Geo fighting game Voltage Fighter Gowcaizer. The same year, her younger brother passed the University of Tsukuba. She played Shiro Bonn in Bomberman B-Daman Bakugaiden and Maron Kusakabe in Phantom Thief Jeanne. She was appointed a cultural ambassador of Iwate Prefecture.

Filmography

Animation

Film

Video games

Tokusatsu

Drama CD

Other dubbing

Notes

References

External links
Official agency profile 

1975 births
Living people
Anime singers
Aoni Production voice actors
Japanese women pop singers
Japanese video game actresses
Japanese voice actresses
Musicians from Iwate Prefecture
Voice actresses from Iwate Prefecture
20th-century Japanese actresses
21st-century Japanese actresses
20th-century Japanese women singers
20th-century Japanese singers
21st-century Japanese women singers
21st-century Japanese singers